Ian Gregory McCall (born July 5, 1984) is a retired American mixed martial artist who competed in the Flyweight and Bantamweight divisions of several prominent MMA promotions, including Ultimate Fighting Championship, Rizin Fighting Federation and World Extreme Cagefighting. He is also a former TPF Flyweight Champion. In between his fights in January 2015 and December 2017, he had been booked for six consecutive cancelled fights, four of which were cancelled during the week of.

Background
McCall was born in Costa Mesa, California and has an older brother, Bradley McCall. McCall got into many "fights" growing up and in his youth, he practiced kung fu. He competed in wrestling for Dana Hills High School where he was a standout and then continued later at Cuesta College, before dropping out to a knee injury. He was also known to fight kids at the town center. Often striking kids for no reason besides being a bully. He was also a part of a gang called the Lords of South County, where the gang would regularly start fights with random people, usually multiple people beating up one unsuspecting person. A few of them were charged for crimes, like former UFC fighter Rob Emerson, but Ian McCall escaped without charges.  During one encounter, McCall attempted an uppercut against an unsuspecting person, but was countered with a right cross and knocked unconscious. During another scuffle, McCall actually punched a lady in the face but he claims he thought she was a man.

Mixed martial arts career

World Extreme Cagefighting
In his WEC tenure, McCall defeated Coty Wheeler and lost to Charlie Valencia in 2007. McCall returned in 2009, but lost to Dominick Cruz.

Tachi Palace Fights
In February, McCall signed a deal with the California-based promotion, Tachi Palace Fights. Ian's first fight was against Jussier Formiga, who at the time was ranked as the #1 Flyweight in the world. McCall upset Formiga with a unanimous decision victory.

On May 6, 2011, McCall then defeated previously unbeaten prospect Dustin Ortiz at Tachi Palace Fights 9, setting up an August 5, 2011 championship bout with the TPF Flyweight Champion Darrell Montague at TPF 10: Tachi Palace Fights 10. He won the title by submitting Montague in round 3 with a rear naked choke.

Ultimate Fighting Championship
McCall signed with the UFC in December 2011 to compete in a four-man Flyweight Tournament to determine the inaugural UFC Flyweight Champion. He faced Demetrious Johnson in the opening round of the tournament on March 3, 2012, at UFC on FX: Alves vs. Kampmann.  Johnson was initially thought to have defeated McCall by majority decision, though was later revealed that a scoring error had taken place and a majority draw was the correct result. This fight was the first flyweight bout in UFC history.

A rematch with Johnson took place on June 8, 2012, at UFC on FX 3 to determine who would meet Joseph Benavidez in the finals of the flyweight tournament. McCall lost the bout via unanimous decision.

McCall was briefly linked to a bout with promotional newcomer John Moraga on August 4, 2012, at UFC on Fox: Shogun vs. Vera.  However, McCall was forced out of the bout with an issue with police and replaced by Ulysses Gomez.

McCall next faced Joseph Benavidez on February 2, 2013, at UFC 156. He lost the fight via unanimous decision.

McCall faced Iliarde Santos on August 3, 2013, at UFC 163. He won the fight via unanimous decision, earning his first UFC win.  The fight also earned him his second Fight of the Night bonus award.

McCall was slated to face Scott Jorgensen on December 14, 2013, at UFC on Fox 9, but was ruled out of the bout due to injury.

McCall was expected to face Brad Pickett on March 8 at UFC Fight Night 37 in London, England. However, on 13 February, it was announced that McCall had pulled out of the bout due to injury and was replaced by promotional newcomer Neil Seery.

The rescheduled bout with Pickett took place on July 19, 2014, at UFC Fight Night 46. McCall won the bout by unanimous decision, having out struck Pickett across three rounds, while displaying strong takedowns and effective ground and pound.

McCall was expected to face John Lineker on November 8, 2014, at UFC Fight Night 56 as the co-main event. Although both fighters successfully made weight, it was announced just hours after the weigh in that McCall had been pulled from the event due to a blood infection.  The bout was pulled from the event entirely.

The bout with Lineker eventually took place on January 31, 2015, at UFC 183. McCall lost the fight by unanimous decision.

A rematch with Dustin Ortiz was expected to take place on August 8, 2015, at UFC Fight Night 73.  However, McCall pulled out of the fight in late July citing injury and was replaced by Willie Gates.

McCall was expected to face Justin Scoggins on July 30, 2016, at UFC 201. However, only 2 days before the event, Scoggins announced he was not going to make the contracted weight. The UFC pulled Scoggins and canceled the bout.

McCall was expected to face Ray Borg on September 10, 2016, at UFC 203. However, Borg pulled out of the fight on September 7 citing an illness. With no time to find a suitable replacement, McCall was removed from the card.

McCall was expected to face Neil Seery on November 19, 2016, at UFC Fight Night 99. However, McCall was pulled from the fight one day before it was scheduled to take place. It was rebooked for UFC 208, and this time Seery pulled out of what was expected to be his retirement bout two weeks before.

McCall was expected to face Jarred Brooks on February 11, 2017, at UFC 208. However, McCall was pulled from the fight the day it was scheduled to take place due to gastrointestinal illness.

McCall was granted his requested release from the UFC in October 2017.

Rizin Fighting Federation
On October 16, 2017, it was announced that McCall had signed with Japan's Rizin Fighting Federation.

McCall's debut was against Manel Kape, as part of Rizin's 2017 Bantamweight World Grand Prix. He lost the fight in the first round by doctor's stoppage due to a cut from the ring ropes.

For his second fight for the promotion, McCall faced fellow UFC veteran Kyoji Horiguchi in the main event at Rizin 10 on May 6, 2018. He lost the fight via knockout just nine seconds into the first round.

Retirement

On May 21, 2018, McCall announced his retirement during The MMA Hour podcast.

Personal life
McCall has a young daughter and a stepson. Alicia suffers from epilepsy and McCall says he will stand by her side as long as she lets him. The couple still haven't set a wedding date but McCall says if he is lucky, it won't be long.

In a 2012 interview with Ariel Helwani, McCall stated that during a hiatus after his last fight in the WEC he overdosed on a combination of oxycodone, GHB, Xanax and other tranquilizers. He awoke two days later in a hospital and later found out his breathing and heartbeat had both stopped. He was revived and recovered to full health within a matter of weeks.

Championships and accomplishments

Mixed martial arts
Ultimate Fighting Championship
Fight of the Night (Two times) vs. Demetrious Johnson and Iliarde Santos
First Flyweight to headline a UFC Event with Demetrious Johnson
Tachi Palace Fights
TPF Flyweight Championship (One time)
Sherdog
2011 Comeback Fighter of the Year
2011 All-Violence First Team

Mixed martial arts record

|-
|Loss
|align=center| 13–7–1
|Kyoji Horiguchi
|KO (punch)
|Rizin 10
|
|align=center|1
|align=center|0:09
|Fukuoka, Japan 
| 
|-
| Loss
| align=center| 13–6–1
| Manel Kape
| TKO (cut)
|Rizin World Grand Prix 2017: 2nd Round
|
| align=center| 1
| align=center| 1:48
|Saitama, Japan
|
|-
| Loss
| align=center| 13–5–1
| John Lineker
| Decision (unanimous)
| UFC 183
| 
| align=center| 3
| align=center| 5:00
| Las Vegas, Nevada, United States
| 
|-
| Win
| align=center| 13–4–1
| Brad Pickett
| Decision (unanimous)
| UFC Fight Night: McGregor vs. Brandao
| 
| align=center| 3
| align=center| 5:00
| Dublin, Ireland
| 
|-
| Win
| align=center| 12–4–1
| Iliarde Santos
| Decision (unanimous)
| UFC 163
| 
| align=center| 3
| align=center| 5:00
| Rio de Janeiro, Brazil
| 
|-
| Loss
| align=center| 11–4–1
| Joseph Benavidez
| Decision (unanimous)
| UFC 156
| 
| align=center| 3
| align=center| 5:00
| Las Vegas, Nevada, United States
| 
|-
| Loss
| align=center| 11–3–1
| Demetrious Johnson
| Decision (unanimous)
| UFC on FX: Johnson vs. McCall
| 
| align=center| 3
| align=center| 5:00
| Sunrise, Florida, United States
| 
|-
| Draw
| align=center| 
| Demetrious Johnson
| Draw (majority)
| UFC on FX: Alves vs. Kampmann
| 
| align=center| 3
| align=center| 5:00
| Sydney, Australia
| 
|-
| Win
| align=center| 11–2
| Darrell Montague
| Submission (rear-naked choke)
| TPF 10: Let The Chips Fall
| 
| align=center| 3
| align=center| 2:15
| Lemoore, California, United States
| 
|-
| Win
| align=center| 10–2
| Dustin Ortiz
| Decision (unanimous)
| TPF 9: The Contenders
| 
| align=center| 3
| align=center| 5:00
| Lemoore, California, United States
| 
|-
| Win
| align=center| 9–2
| Jussier Formiga
| Decision (unanimous)
| TPF 8: All or Nothing
| 
| align=center| 3
| align=center| 5:00
| Lemoore, California, United States
| 
|-
| Win
| align=center| 8–2
| Jeff Willingham
| Submission (triangle choke)
| MEZ Sports: Pandemonium 3
| 
| align=center| 1
| align=center| 2:17
| Los Angeles, California, United States
| 
|-
| Loss
| align=center| 7–2
| Dominick Cruz
| Decision (unanimous)
| WEC 38
| 
| align=center| 3
| align=center| 5:00
| San Diego, California, United States
| 
|-
| Win
| align=center| 7–1
| Kevin Dunsmoor
| Decision (unanimous)
| Total Combat 32
| 
| align=center| 3
| align=center| 5:00
| El Cajon, California, United States
| 
|-
| Loss
| align=center| 6–1
| Charlie Valencia
| Submission (guillotine choke)
| WEC 31
| 
| align=center| 1
| align=center| 3:19
| Las Vegas, Nevada, United States
| 
|-
| Win
| align=center| 6–0
| Coty Wheeler
| TKO (punches)
| WEC 30
| 
| align=center| 3
| align=center| 4:34
| Las Vegas, Nevada, United States
| 
|-
| Win
| align=center| 5–0
| Rick McCorkell
| KO (punch)
| Battle in the Ballroom: Summer Fist 2007
| 
| align=center| 1
| align=center| 0:13
| Costa Mesa, California, United States
| 
|-
| Win
| align=center| 4–0
| Chris David
| Decision (unanimous)
| Total Combat 15
| 
| align=center| 3
| align=center| N/A
| San Diego, California, United States
| 
|-
| Win
| align=center| 3–0
| Musa Toliver
| TKO (corner stoppage)
| WFC: Rumble at the Ramada
| 
| align=center| 2
| align=center| N/A
| Norwalk, California, United States
| 
|-
| Win
| align=center| 2–0
| Chris Acevedo
| TKO (corner stoppage)
| Crown Fighting Championship 1
| 
| align=center| 1
| align=center| N/A
| Rosarito Beach, Mexico
| 
|-
| Win
| align=center| 1–0
| Jerry Samson
| Submission (rear-naked choke)
| Warriors Quest 6: Best of the Best
| 
| align=center| 2
| align=center| 2:32
| Honolulu, Hawaii, United States
|

See also
 List of current UFC fighters
 List of male mixed martial artists

References

External links

Official UFC Profile

1984 births
Flyweight mixed martial artists
Living people
American male mixed martial artists
American wushu practitioners
Sportspeople from Orange County, California
People from Costa Mesa, California
Mixed martial artists from California
Mixed martial artists utilizing wushu
Mixed martial artists utilizing Brazilian jiu-jitsu
Ultimate Fighting Championship male fighters
American practitioners of Brazilian jiu-jitsu